Henry de Menten de Horne (7 December 1896 – 27 December 1988) was a Belgian equestrian. He competed in two events at the 1936 Summer Olympics.

References

External links
 

1896 births
1988 deaths
Belgian male equestrians
Olympic equestrians of Belgium
Equestrians at the 1936 Summer Olympics
Sportspeople from Liège Province